Tom McArdle is an American film editor. He is best known as the editor for every film written and directed by Tom McCarthy, including The Station Agent (2003), The Visitor (2007), Win Win (2011) and The Cobbler (2014). For Spotlight (2015), his latest collaboration with McCarthy, McArdle was nominated for the Academy Award for Best Film Editing at the 88th Academy Awards and also won the Independent Spirit Award for Best Editing.

Filmography

As an editor

 Stillwater (2021)
 Timmy Failure: Mistakes Were Made (2020)
 What They Had (2018)
 Marshall (2017)
 Spotlight (2015)
 The Cobbler (2014)
 God's Pocket (2014)
 In a World... (2013)
 Hello I Must Be Going (2012)
 Win Win (2011)
 Tenure (2008)
 Middle of Nowhere (2008)
 Heckler (2007) (Documentary)
 The Visitor (2007)
 The Architect (2006)
 Nadine in Date Land (2005) (TV Movie)
 Duane Hopwood (2005)
 Killer Diller (2004)
 Boys on the Run (2003)
 The Killing Zone (2003)
 The Station Agent (2003)
 Lone Hero (2002)
 Whipped (2000)
 Poor White Trash (2000)
 Loving Jezebel (1999)
 QM, I Think I Call Her QM (1999) (Short)
 Nazis: The Occult Conspiracy (1998) (Documentary)
 Hi-Life (1998)
 Paranoia (1998)
 A Hole in the Head (1998) (Documentary)
 Better Than Ever (1997)
 Talk to Me (1997)
 Star Maps (1997)
 Twisted (1996)
 Sandman (Short) (1995)
 The Keeper (1995)
 Hand Gun (1994)
 The Occult History of the Third Reich (Video Documentary) (1992)
 Laws of Gravity (1992)

Other credits
 2005: The Quiet (additional editor)
 2003: The Killing Zone (associate producer)
 2002: The Skateboard Show (TV Movie) (additional editor)

Accolades

See also
List of film director and editor collaborations

References

External links 

Living people
American film editors
American Cinema Editors
Independent Spirit Award winners
Year of birth missing (living people)